The 1944–45 Oregon Webfoots men's basketball team were a college basketball team that represented the University of Oregon during the 1944–45 NCAA men's basketball season. The Webfoots, coached by John A. Warren, played in the Pacific Coast Conference (PCC) and compiled a 30–15 win–loss record in regular and postseason competition and an 11–5 record in conference play. Overall they finished with a home record of 13–6, away record of 16–7, and a neutral record of 1–2. They finished 3rd regionally in the NCAA Tournament. With a total of 45 games played, that is the most in NCAA history for one season.

Schedule

Notes and references 

 
 

Oregon Ducks men's basketball seasons
Oregon
Oregon
Oregon Webfoots men's b
Oregon Webfoots men's b